Renáta Tobai-Sike (born 10 July 1978) is a Hungarian shooter. She represented her country at the 2016 Summer Olympics.

References 

1978 births
Living people
Hungarian female sport shooters
Shooters at the 2016 Summer Olympics
Olympic shooters of Hungary
European Games competitors for Hungary
Shooters at the 2015 European Games
21st-century Hungarian women